Astrothelium cryptolucens is a species of corticolous (bark-dwelling), crustose lichen in the family Trypetheliaceae. Found in Panama, it was formally described as a new species in 2016 by Robert Lücking, Matthew Nelsen, and Noris Salazar Allen. The species epithet cryptolucens makes reference both to the habit of the immersed perithecia and the presence of lichexanthone. The characteristics of the lichen that distinguish it from others in genus Astrothelium are the finely and densely cracked pseudostromata that dominate the thallus, with dispersed thallus bumps; and the hardly visible ascomata that are completely immersed in pseudostromata. A. cryptolucens is somewhat similar to Astrothelium carrascoense, but that species does not have an inspersed .

References

cryptolucens
Lichen species
Lichens described in 2016
Taxa named by Robert Lücking
Lichens of Central America